is a former Nippon Professional Baseball pitcher for the Tohoku Rakuten Golden Eagles in Japan's Pacific League. He also previously played for the Fukuoka Daiei Hawks, the Nippon-Ham Fighters, and the Hanshin Tigers.

External links

Living people
1968 births
People from Nagasaki
Japanese baseball players
Nippon Professional Baseball pitchers
Fukuoka Daiei Hawks players
Nippon Ham Fighters players
Hanshin Tigers players
Tohoku Rakuten Golden Eagles players